Valur Einar Valsson (born 24 December 1961) is a retired Icelandic football midfielder.

References

External links
 Profile at Football Association of Iceland

1961 births
Living people
Valur Valsson
Valur Valsson
Valur Valsson
Valur Valsson
Association football midfielders
Valur Valsson